DBmaestro is a computer software company with sales headquartered in Boston, and development in Israel. It markets its services for DevOps: collaboration between development and IT operations teams.

DBmaestro was founded in 2012 by Yariv Tabac and Yaniv Yehuda . To date, the company raised venture capital funding of $7.5m.

Products
DBmaestro's DevOps Platform software focuses on database development and controls application specific data.
DBmaestro integrates with other technologies such as Oracle Database, Microsoft SQL Server, IBM Db2 and PostgreSQL.

DBmaestro software as a service offers database release automation capabilities designed to optimize DevOps environments for enterprises by automating continuous integration and continuous delivery (CI/CD) processes for databases with zero disruption to existing processes. DBmaestro's DevOps platform offers a visual database pipeline builder, which enables organizations to package, verify, deploy, and promote database changes, and a release automation module, which revalidates the final state to make sure the release process ended successfully, while auditing all changes made.

In 2015, DBmaestro was recognized by the editors of SD Times, Computing magazine,
and a market research company. In 2018, DBmaestro was honored as a Bronze Stevie Award Winner for New Product or Service of the Year - Software - DevOps Solution

In July, 2019, DBmaestro announced a global reselling partnership agreement with IBM, in which IBM will be offering DBmaestro’s platform to its worldwide enterprise customer base.

External links
 DBmaestro website
 SQL Server Central (SQL Server education and community website)

References 

Software development
2012 establishments in Israel
Agile software development
Software development process
Information technology management